Nitrogen mustards are cytotoxic organic compounds with the chloroethylamine ((ClCH2)2NR2) functional group. Although originally produced as chemical warfare agents, they were the first chemotherapeutic agents for treatment of cancer.  Nitrogen mustards are nonspecific DNA alkylating agents.

Chemical warfare
During World War II nitrogen mustards were studied at the Yale School of Medicine by Alfred Gilman and Louis Goodman, and classified human clinical trials of nitrogen mustards for the treatment of lymphoma started in December 1942. Also during World War II, an incident during the air raid on Bari, Italy, led to the release of mustard gas that affected several hundred soldiers and civilians. Medical examination of the survivors showed a decreased number of lymphocytes. After World War II was over, the Bari incident and the Yale group's studies eventually converged prompting a search for other similar compounds. Due to its use in previous studies, the nitrogen mustard known as "HN2" became the first chemotherapy drug mustine.

Nitrogen mustards are not related to the mustard plant or its pungent essence, allyl isothiocyanate; the name comes from the pungent smell of chemical weapons preparations.

Examples
The nitrogen mustard drug mustine (HN2), is no longer commonly in use in its original IV formulation because of excessive toxicity. Other nitrogen mustards developed include cyclophosphamide, chlorambucil, uramustine, melphalan, and bendamustine. Bendamustine has recently re-emerged as a viable chemotherapeutic treatment.

Nitrogen mustards that can be used for chemical warfare purposes are tightly regulated. Their weapon designations are:
 HN1: Bis(2-chloroethyl)ethylamine
 HN2: Bis(2-chloroethyl)methylamine
 HN3: Tris(2-chloroethyl)amine

Nor-mustard can be used in the synthesis of piperazine drugs. For example, mazapertine, aripiprazole & fluanisone. Canfosfamide was also made from normustard.

Some nitrogen mustards of opiates were also prepared, although these are not known to be antineoplastic. Examples include Chlornaltrexamine and Chloroxymorphamine.

Mechanism of action
Nitrogen mustards (NMs) form cyclic aminium ions (aziridinium rings) by intramolecular displacement of the chloride by the amine nitrogen. This aziridinium group then alkylates DNA once it is attacked by the N-7 nucleophilic center on the guanine base. A second attack after the displacement of the second chlorine forms the second alkylation step that results in the formation of interstrand cross-links (ICLs) as it was shown in the early 1960s. At that time it was proposed that the ICLs were formed between N-7 atom of guanine residue in a 5’-d(GC) sequence. Later it was clearly demonstrated that NMs form a 1,3 ICL in the 5’-d(GNC) sequence.

The strong cytotoxic effect caused by the formation of ICLs is what makes NMs an effective chemotherapeutic agent. Other compounds used in cancer chemotherapy that have the ability to form ICLs are cisplatin, mitomycin C, carmustine, and psoralen. These kinds of lesions are effective at forcing the cell to undergo apoptosis via p53, a protein which scans the genome for defects. Note that the alkylating damage itself is not cytotoxic and does not directly cause cell death.

Safety
Nitrogen mustards are powerful and persistent blister agents. HN1, HN2, HN3 are therefore classified as Schedule 1 substances within the Chemical Weapons Convention. Production and use is therefore strongly restricted.

Further reading

References

Blister agents
IARC Group 2A carcinogens
 
Cancer treatments